National Route 180 is a national highway of Japan connecting Okayama and Matsue in Japan, with a total length of 198.9 km (123.59 mi).

References

National highways in Japan
Roads in Okayama Prefecture
Roads in Shimane Prefecture
Roads in Tottori Prefecture